Ahuiateteo or Macuiltonaleque were a group of five Aztec gods of excess and pleasure. They also represented the dangers that come along with these. These five gods were also invoked by diviners and mystics. They were associated with the Tzitzimimeh, a group of frightening beings that personified death, drought, and war.

The five gods are:
 Macuilcozcacuauhtli (Five vulture), the god of gluttony
 Macuilcuetzpalin (Five lizard)
 Macuilmalinalli (Five grass)
 Macuiltochtli (Five rabbit), the god of drunkenness
 Macuilxochitl (Five flower), the god of gambling and music and an aspect of Xōchipilli

References

Bibliography

;  (2003, 1993). An Illustrated Dictionary of the Gods and Symbols of Ancient Mexico and the Maya. London: Thames & Hudson. . 
 (Spring 1998). Themes of Drunkenness, Violence, and Factionalism in Tlaxcalan Altar Paintings. RES: Anthropology and Aesthetics No. 33, Pre-Columbian States of Being, pp. 184–207. The President and Fellows of Harvard College acting through the Peabody Museum of Archaeology and Ethnology  

Aztec gods
Aztec mythology and religion
Drought gods